Ako imaš s kim i gde (trans. If You Have With Whom And Where) is the fourth studio album by the Serbian alternative rock band Block Out, released by Multimedia records in 2004.

Track listing 
All tracks written by Nikola Vranjković.
 "Nevremena" – 5:08
 "Iz tri vode" – 6:01
 "Tata Brada" – 6:31
 "Majdan" – 8:41
 "Bedem" – 5:28
 "Težak slučaj pakla" – 7:10
 "Andrej" – 8:57
 "Nema više lakih protivnika" – 4:14
 "Bunar želja ne postoji" – 4:31
 "Dan koji nikad nije došao" – 3:10
 "Ako imaš s kim i gde" – 5:32
 "Tehno...logija" – 8:36

Personnel 
 Aleksandar Balać – bass, vocals
 Miljko Radonjić – drums
 Dejan Hasečić – guitar, synthesizer
 Nikola Vranjković – guitar, vocals, producer
 Milutin Jovančić – vocals

Additional personnel 
 Nemanja Popović – backing vocals
 Darko Marković – co-producer, mixed by
 Bojan Drobac – mastered by
 Branko Maćić – mastered by
 Ivan Brusić – mastered by
 Saša Janković – mixed by
 Dušan Živanović – percussion
 Marko Jovanović – recorded by
 Ana Đokić – synthesizer on track 5 and 8
 Darko Marković – guitar on track 6
 Dejan Grujić – guitar on track 9

External links 
 EX YU ROCK enciklopedija 1960-2006, Janjatović Petar; 
 Ako imaš s kim i gde at Discogs

Block Out (band) albums
2004 albums